Koshku (also Romanized as Koshkū and Kashkū; also known as Kish Kūh, Kooshk, Koshkūh, Kūshkū, and Poshtkūh) is a village in Eshkanan Rural District, Eshkanan District, Lamerd County, Fars Province, Iran. At the 2006 census, its population was 639, in 152 families.

References 

Populated places in Lamerd County